This is a list of prominent people or groups who formally endorsed or voiced support for presidential hopeful Mitt Romney's 2012 presidential election campaign during the Republican Party primaries and the general election.

Former U.S. presidents, vice presidents, and spouses

Former 2012 presidential candidates

U.S. Senators

Current

Former

U.S. Representatives

Current

Former

Governors

Current

Former

State, local and territory officials

Mayors/Vice Mayors

Publications 
See: Newspaper endorsements in the United States presidential election, 2012

National political figures and former cabinet officials

International political figures 
 Daniel Hannan, British Conservative Party MEP for South East England
 Lech Wałęsa, former President of Poland (1990–1995)

Miscellaneous 

 First Lady Lucé Vela of Puerto Rico

US Armed Forces members

Businesspeople

Social and political activists

Clergy

Astronauts/NASA 
 Eric C. Anderson
 Gene Cernan
 Scott Pace

Organizations

Companies

Entertainers and artists

Actors

Comedians

Directors

Models

Musicians

Bands

Adult entertainers

Producers

Screenwriters

Television and radio personalities

Writers

Athletes

Baseball (MLB)

Basketball (NBA)

Bobsled

Football (NFL)

Golf

Ice skating/hockey

Skeet shooting
 Kim Rhode

Skeleton racing

Skiing
 Christopher Devlin-Young

Swimming
 Rowdy Gaines

Tennis
 Jim Courier

Auto racing (NASCAR)

Professional wrestling

Economics Nobel Prize laureates 
Gary Becker
James Buchanan
Eugene Fama
Robert Lucas, Jr.
Robert Mundell
Edward C. Prescott
Myron Scholes

See also 
 Endorsements for the Republican Party presidential primaries, 2012
 List of Barack Obama presidential campaign endorsements, 2012
 List of Ron Paul 2012 presidential campaign endorsements 
 Mitt Romney presidential campaign, 2012

References 

Romney presidential campaign endorsements, 2012
Campaign endorsements, 2012
Romney, Mitt
Romney, Mitt